The Ethical Slut: A Guide to Infinite Sexual Possibilities is an English language non-fiction book by Dossie Easton and Janet Hardy (given as pseudonym Catherine A. Liszt for the book's first edition in 1997).

Content
The authors define the term slut as "a person of any gender who has the courage to lead life according to the radical proposition that sex is nice and pleasure is good for you." The term is reclaimed from its usual use as a pejorative and as a simple label for a promiscuous person. Instead, it is used to signify a person who is accepting of their enjoyment of sex and the pleasure of physical intimacy with others, and chooses to engage and accept these in an ethical and open way—rather than as cheating.

The Ethical Slut discusses how to live an active life with multiple concurrent sexual relationships in a fair and honest way. Discussion topics include how to deal with the practical difficulties and opportunities in finding and keeping partners, maintaining relationships with others, and strategies for personal growth.

It contains chapters discussing how consensual non-monogamy is handled in different subcultures such as the gay and lesbian communities, information on handling scheduling, jealousy, communication, conflict in relationships, and etiquette for group sexual encounters.

Adaptations 
A 2007 article in the East Bay Express reported that Moses Ma would be producing a movie adaptation, but as of 2014, the project had not come to fruition.

In 2013, Ben Fritz (producer/director) raised funding privately and via Kickstarter to create an episodic web series inspired by the book with input from Easton and Hardy.  By 2016, four seasons of The Ethical Slut were released on YouTube despite struggles for funding after the first season.  There are 50 episodes, which range between 4 and 9 minutes. The series follows two female friends as they decide to explore open relationships with the help of The Ethical Slut.

A play adaptation of the book by John Sable called Multiple O, described as an "erotic comedy", opened on May 2, 2008, at the Broom Street Theater in Madison, Wisconsin.

Editions

Second edition (2009) 
In May 2007, co-author Dossie Easton reported that she and Liszt were working on a second edition, including more communication exercises and information about online polyamory communities. It was published in March 2009 and is called The Ethical Slut: A Practical Guide to Polyamory, Open Relationships & Other Adventures.

Third edition (2017) 
A third edition was released in August 2017 entitled The Ethical Slut, Third Edition: A Practical Guide to Polyamory, Open Relationships, and Other Freedoms in Sex and Love. It was revised to include interviews with polyamorous millennials, who had grown up without the prejudices their elders encountered regarding gender, orientation, sexuality, and relationships. It also contains tributes to poly pioneers and sidebars on topics such as asexuality and sex workers. The authors also include new content addressing nontraditional relationships beyond the polyamorous paradigm of "more than two": couples who don't live together, couples who don't have sex with each other, nonparallel arrangements, couples with widely divergent sex styles, power disparities, and cross-orientation relationships, while utilizing non-binary gender language and new terms that have come into common usage since the last edition.

Translations 
The Ethical Slut has been translated into several different languages, including French, Spanish, Italian, German, and Russian.

 Russian: Этика бл**ства, published in 2006
 French: La Salope éthique: Guide pratique pour des relations libres sereines, published by Tabou Éditions in April 2013
 Spanish: Ética promiscua, published by Editorial Melusina in 2013 
 Italian: La zoccola etica. Guida al poliamore, alle relazioni aperte e altre avventure, published by Odoya in January 2014
 German: Schlampen mit Moral. Eine praktische Anleitung für Polyamorie, offene Beziehungen und andere Abenteuer, published by mvg Verlag in May 2014

See also 
 A Vindication of the Rights of Whores
 Consensual non-monogamy
 Polyamory
 Sexecology
 Sex-positive feminism
 Sex-positive movement
 Swinging

References

External links

 A review of The Ethical Slut
 Comic on Qwantz Dinosaur Comics

1997 non-fiction books
English-language books
Sexual ethics books
Polyamory
Sex positivism
Sexual fidelity
Non-fiction books about sexuality
Works published under a pseudonym